The Virginia Law Review is a law review edited and published by students at University of Virginia School of Law. It was established on March 15, 1913, and permanently organized later that year. The stated objective of the Virginia Law Review is "to publish a professional periodical devoted to law-related issues that can be of use to judges, practitioners, teachers, legislators, students, and others interested in the law." In addition to articles, the journal regularly publishes scholarly essays and student notes. A companion online publication, Virginia Law Review Online (formerly In Brief), has been in publication since 2007. The current editor-in-chief is Scott Chamberlain (2022–2023).

The Virginia Law Review consistently ranks among the top ten most cited law journals. In addition, it is accessible on electronic databases such as Westlaw, LexisNexis, and HeinOnline.

Notable articles 
The following articles published in the Virginia Law Review are among "The Most-Cited Law Review Articles of All Time":

References 

University of Virginia School of Law
American law journals
General law journals
English-language journals
Publications established in 1913
Law journals edited by students
1913 establishments in Virginia
8 times per year journals